David Axel Stenmarck (born February 20, 1974) better known as  David Stenmarck  is a Swedish musical artist, songwriter, producer and CEO of Sweden based royalty-free soundtrack providing company "Epidemic Sound".

Career
Stenmarck started his career as a singer, he then started writing and producing.

References

Living people
1974 births